The 1982 Georgia Southern Eagles football team represented the Georgia Southern Eagles of Georgia Southern College (now known as Georgia Southern University) during the 1982 NCAA Division I-AA football season. This was the Eagles' first season of football since the suspension of the program following the 1941 season. The Eagles played their home games at Womack Stadium in Statesboro, Georgia. The team was coached by Erk Russell, in his first year as head coach for the Eagles.

Schedule

References

Georgia Southern
Georgia Southern Eagles football seasons
Georgia Southern Eagles football